A bus ride is a ride on a bus.

Bus Ride may also refer to:

Books
Bus Ride, children's book by Marilyn Sachs 1980

Music
"Bus Ride", song by Ry Cooder from My Blueberry Nights Original Soundtrack 2008
"Bus Ride", single by Alex Lloyd 2002
"Bus Ride", song by Quasimoto from The Further Adventures of Lord Quas
"Bus Ride", by will.i.am from Freedom Writers Original Soundtrack	2007
"Bus Ride", by Georges Delerue from Crimes of the Heart Original Motion Picture Score  1986 
"Bus Ride", by Reuben Wilson from Blue Mode 1969	
"Bus Ride", by Rocco DeLuca and the Burden from I Trust You to Kill Me 2006
"Bus Ride", by Kaytranada from 99.9% 2016